Lindsey Jane Drew (born 11 May 1958), known professionally as Linzi Drew, is an English former glamour model, producer, adult model and pornographic actress.

Career
Linzi Drew was born on 11 May 1958 in Bristol, England. During a varied career in the UK sex industry, she worked as a Page 3 girl, stripper, glamour model and porn actress, and was at one time the editor of the British edition of Penthouse magazine. In the 1980s, she appeared nude each month in the softcore magazine Club International.

In the 1990s, Drew was arrested for illegally distributing pornography, something which she and then-boyfriend Simon Honey a.k.a. Ben Dover discussed in a BBC Open Space documentary titled "More Sex Please, We're British" (1993).

Drew retired from the porn industry at the age of 35.

In 1993, she published her autobiography Try Everything Once Except Incest and Morris Dancing: The Intimate Autobiography of a Dangerous Lady. The book chronicles her time as a groupie and her career as a glamour model and porn star.

Appearances

Under the direction of glamour photographer George Harrison Marks, Drew starred in two short erotic corporal punishment videos: Warden’s End (1981), produced by Janus magazine, and The Cane and Mr. Abel (1984), released by Kane International Video, a publishing company owned by Marks.

Drew has also had minor roles in a handful of mainstream films, including An American Werewolf in London (1981) and The Rainbow Thief (1990), and a number of Ken Russell films, including Salome's Last Dance (1988), The Lair of the White Worm (1988) and the Nessun dorma  segment of the multi-director film Aria (1987).

She also appeared on the front cover of the 1984 Roger Waters concept album The Pros and Cons of Hitch Hiking  and in the film back-projected during the accompanying live tour.

Drew played the role of "rack girl" during American hard rockers W.A.S.P.'s appearance at the 1987 Monsters of Rock festival.

See also
 List of British pornographic actors
 Page 3
 Pornography in the United Kingdom

References

External links 
 
 
 
 

1958 births
English female adult models
English pornographic film actresses
English television producers
Living people
Page 3 girls
Actresses from Bristol
British television producers
British pornographic film producers
British women television producers